HMNZS Hinau (P3556) was a Moa-class inshore patrol vessel of the Royal New Zealand Navy. It was commissioned in 1985 for the Naval Volunteer Reserve and decommissioned in 2007.

Hinau is the second ship with this name to serve in the Royal New Zealand Navy. The name comes from the forest tree Elaeocarpus dentatus which is native to New Zealand.

See also 
 Patrol boats of the Royal New Zealand Navy

Moa-class patrol boats
1985 ships